The following units and commanders fought in the Confederate Army of Tennessee during the Battle of Atlanta on July 22, 1864. The Union order of battle is listed separately. The orders of battle for the first and second phases of the campaign are listed separately as well.

Abbreviations used

Military rank
 Gen = General
 LTG = Lieutenant General
 MG = Major General
 BG = Brigadier General
 Col = Colonel
 Ltc = Lieutenant Colonel
 Maj = Major
 Cpt = Captain
 Lt = Lieutenant

Other
 (w) = wounded
 (mw) = mortally wounded
 (k) = killed
 (c) = captured

Army of Tennessee
Gen John B. Hood

Hardee's Corps

LTG William J. Hardee

Hood's Corps

MG Benjamin F. Cheatham

Georgia State Militia

Cavalry Corps
MG Joseph Wheeler

Bibliography 
 

American Civil War orders of battle
order of battle